The Aynsley Dunbar Retaliation is the 1968 debut album by The Aynsley Dunbar Retaliation, a vehicle for drummer Aynsley Dunbar after stints in John Mayall & the Bluesbreakers and The Jeff Beck Group. The album was released in 1968 in Canada, France, Sweden, the UK, and the US with a limited re-release the following year. The cover art was designed by Hipgnosis.

Track listing
All titles published by Lupus Music except 'See See Baby' (Leeds Music) and 'Memory of Pain' (MCPS).

Personnel
The Aynsley Dunbar Retaliation
Victor Brox - vocals, guitar, keyboard, horns
John Morshead - lead guitar, vocals
Alex Dmochowski - bass
Aynsley Dunbar - drums
Technical
Victor Gamm - engineer

References

External links

1968 debut albums
Aynsley Dunbar albums
EMI Records albums
albums produced by Ian Samwell
Albums with cover art by Hipgnosis